Eileen C. Flockhart is a Democratic former member of the New Hampshire House of Representatives, representing the Rockingham 13th District from 2004 through 2014.

Education
Flockhart received her B.A. from The Catholic University of America in the year of 1966.

Political experience
Flockhart has had the following political experience:
Candidate, New Hampshire House of Representatives, District Rockingham 18, 2012
Representative, New Hampshire State House of Representatives, 2004-2014
Member, New Hampshire Democratic Party, 1982–present
Candidate, New Hampshire State House of Representatives, Rockingham 83, 2002
Member, Rockingham County Democratic Party, 1992
Member, Exeter, Democratic Party, 1982

Caucuses/non-legislative committees
Member, Legislative Caucus for Young Children, 2004
Member, Task Force on Deaf and Hard of Hearing, 2004
Board Member, Dover Schools Professional Development Committee, 1997-2004
Board Member, Exeter 350th Committee, 1986-1988

References

External links
New Hampshire House of Representatives - Eileen Flockhart official NH House website
Project Vote Smart - Representative Eileen C. Flockhart (NH) profile
Follow the Money - Eileen C Flockhart
2006 2004 2002 campaign contributions

Members of the New Hampshire House of Representatives
1944 births
Living people
Women state legislators in New Hampshire
People from Port Washington, New York
21st-century American women